The second competition weekend of the 2013–14 ISU Speed Skating World Cup was held in the Utah Olympic Oval in Salt Lake City, United States, from Friday, November 15, until Sunday, November 17, 2013.

World records were broken four times during the weekend. On Friday, Lee Sang-hwa of South Korea broke the women's 500 metres record she set the previous weekend with a time of 36.57 seconds. In the second 500 metres race on the next day, she broke it again, this time with a time of 36.36 seconds. Also on Saturday, the Dutch men's team improved the team pursuit world record, which had also been set the previous weekend, with a time of 3:35.60. Finally, on Sunday, Brittany Bowe of the United States broke the women's 1000 metres record with a time of 1:12.58.

Two world records for juniors were also broken. On Friday, Antoinette de Jong of the Netherlands broke the girls' world record on 3000 metres with a time of 3:59.49, becoming the first junior to achieve a time under four minutes for the distance, a result that was good enough for a bronze medal. On Sunday, Kim Hyun-yung of South Korea broke the girls' world record on 1000 metres with a time of 1:14.95.

Schedule
The detailed schedule of events:

All times are MST (UTC−7).

Medal summary

Men's events

Women's events

Standings
The top ten standings in the contested cups after the weekend. The top five nations in the team pursuit cups.

Men's cups
500 m

1000 m

1500 m

5000/10000 m

Team pursuit

Grand World Cup

Women's cups
500 m

1000 m

1500 m

3000/5000 m

Team pursuit

Grand World Cup

References

 
2
Isu World Cup, 2013-14, 2
Sports in Salt Lake City
ISU Speed Skating